Wolfgang Amadeus Mozart's String Duo No. 2 in B-flat major for violin and viola, K. 424, the second of the two Mozart wrote [see String Duo No. 1 (Mozart)] to complete Michael Haydn's set of six for the Archbishop Colloredo, was written in the summer of 1783. It is in three movements:

 Adagio-Allegro, common time
 Andante cantabile, E-flat major, 6/8
 Andante grazioso, cut time

The last movement is a theme with six variations and a coda. As a whole, this duo blends in better with Haydn's four because the viola is more limited to providing harmony than in K. 423. The set of six was presented as all Haydn's, and Colloredo was unable to "detect in them Mozart's obvious workmanship."

The Austrian composer Gerhard Präsent has made an arrangement for string trio (2 violins & violoncello) in 2012, regularly performed by the ALEA Ensemble.

References

External links
 

Chamber music by Wolfgang Amadeus Mozart
Compositions in B-flat major
1783 compositions